David Whyte (20 April 1971 – 9 September 2014) was an English professional footballer who played as a striker.

Career
Born in Greenwich, Whyte played for Greenwich Borough, Crystal Palace, Charlton Athletic, Reading, Ipswich Town, Bristol Rovers and Southend United.

He signed for Charlton Athletic in June 1994, alongside Paul Mortimer, in a part-exchange deal with Crystal Palace; Darren Pitcher moved in the opposite direction.

He retired in 1999, at the age of 28.

Later life and death
Whyte died on 9 September 2014, at the age of 43.

References

1971 births
2014 deaths
Footballers from Greenwich
English footballers
Association football forwards
Greenwich Borough F.C. players
Crystal Palace F.C. players
Charlton Athletic F.C. players
Reading F.C. players
Ipswich Town F.C. players
Bristol Rovers F.C. players
Southend United F.C. players
English Football League players
Black British sportsmen